The Little Saint Roch River (French: Rivière du Rochu) is a river in Quebec and Maine. 
From its source, in L'Islet RCM, the river runs south and southeast across the Canada–United States border to the Shields Branch of the Big Black River in Maine Township 15, Range 15, WELS.

See also
List of rivers of Maine

References

Maine Streamflow Data from the USGS
Maine Watershed Data From Environmental Protection Agency

Tributaries of the Saint John River (Bay of Fundy)
Rivers of Aroostook County, Maine